Cycas nathorstii is a species of cycad native to Sri Lanka and Tamil Nadu, India.

References

nathorstii
Flora of Sri Lanka
Flora of Tamil Nadu